The 1971 Rothmans International Vancouver – Singles was an event of the 1971 Rothmans International Vancouver tennis tournament played at the PNE Agrodome in Vancouver, Canada from 3 October through 11 October 1971. Rod Laver was the defending champion but lost in the semifinals. Ken Rosewall won the singles title, defeating Tom Okker in the final, 6–2, 6–2, 6–4.

Draw

Finals

Top half

Bottom half

References

External links
 ITF tournament edition details

1971 in Canadian tennis